Abbot is a town in Piscataquis County, Maine, United States. The population was 650 at the 2020 census. It was named for the treasurer of Bowdoin College, John Abbot.

Geography

Demographics

2010 census
As of the census of 2010, there were 714 people, 311 households, and 214 families living in the town. The racial makeup of the town was 98.3% White, 0.1% African American, 0.1% Native American, 0.1% Asian, and 1.3% from two or more races. Hispanic or Latino of any race were 0.6% of the population.

There were 311 households, of which 23.5% had children under the age of 18 living with them, 56.6% were married couples living together, 8.0% had a female householder with no husband present, 4.2% had a male householder with no wife present, and 31.2% were non-families. 24.8% of all households were made up of individuals, and 10% had someone living alone who was 65 years of age or older. The average household size was 2.25 and the average family size was 2.62.

The median age in the town was 49.3 years. 17.2% of residents were under the age of 18; 4.9% were between the ages of 18 and 24; 20.3% were from 25 to 44; 39.1% were from 45 to 64; and 18.5% were 65 years of age or older. The gender makeup of the town was 48.3% male and 51.7% female.

2000 census
As of the census of 2000, there were 630 people, 272 households, and 196 families living in the town.  The population density was 18.1 people per square mile (7.0/km).  There were 461 housing units at an average density of 13.3 per square mile (5.1/km).  The racial makeup of the town was 98.25% White, 0.16% African American, 0.63% Native American, 0.16% Pacific Islander, 0.48% from other races, and 0.32% from two or more races.

There were 272 households, out of which 24.6% had children under the age of 18 living with them, 58.8% were married couples living together, 8.1% had a female householder with no husband present, and 27.9% were non-families. 21.7% of all households were made up of individuals, and 9.9% had someone living alone who was 65 years of age or older.  The average household size was 2.32 and the average family size was 2.68.

In the town, the population was spread  19.5% under the age of 18, 4.4% from 18 to 24, 27.8% from 25 to 44, 32.5% from 45 to 64, and 15.7% who were 65 years of age or older.  The median age was 44 years. For every 100 females, there were 98.7 males.  For every 100 females age 18 and over, there were 99.6 males.

The median income for a household in the town was $33,229, and the median income for a family was $36,827. Males had a median income of $29,000 versus $22,955 for females. The per capita income for the town was $16,001.  About 6.4% of families and 10.2% of the population were below the poverty line, including 10.8% of those under age 18 and 20.5% of those age 65 or over.

Voter registration

References

External links
 Photograph of Abbot, Maine, from the Maine Memory Network

Towns in Piscataquis County, Maine
Towns in Maine